Macrocheilus hybridus is a species of ground beetle in the subfamily Anthiinae. It was described by Peringuey in 1896.

References

Anthiinae (beetle)
Beetles described in 1896